The Journal of Food Engineering is a biweekly peer-reviewed scientific journal covering engineering, science, and technology related to food production. The editor-in-chief is R. Paul Singh (University of California, Davis).

According to the Journal Citation Reports, the journal has a 2014 impact factor of 2.771, ranking it 19th out of 123 journals in the category "Food Science & Technology".

References

External links 
 
 

Elsevier academic journals
English-language journals
Food science journals
Biweekly journals
Publications established in 1982